Vlastimil Mařinec (born 9 January 1957) is a retired Czechoslovak long and triple jumper.

He finished fifth at the 1983 World Championships and won the silver medal at the 1984 European Indoor Championships, In the long jump he competed at the 1983 World Championships without reaching the final.

He became Czechoslovak champion in 1980, 1981, 1983 and 1984 as well as in long jump in 1983; and Czechoslovak indoor champion in 1981.

His personal best jump was 17.21 metres, achieved in June 1983 in Bratislava.

References

1947 births
Living people
People from Klatovy
Czechoslovak male triple jumpers
Czechoslovak male long jumpers
Sportspeople from the Plzeň Region